Nucleic acid binding protein 1 is a protein that in humans is encoded by the NABP1 gene.

Function 

Single-stranded DNA (ssDNA)-binding proteins, such as OBFC2A, are ubiquitous and essential for a variety of DNA metabolic processes, including replication, recombination, and detection and repair of damage.

References

Further reading